The 1946 Combined English Universities by-election was a parliamentary by-election held on 18 March 1946 for the British House of Commons constituency of Combined English Universities.

There was no Labour Party candidate, which did not occur again in a Great Britain by-election in the UK until the 2008 Haltemprice and Howden by-election. It was the penultimate election in a university constituency to the British Parliament and the final one to occur in England, with all university constituencies abolished in 1950.

The winning candidate vote share of 30 per cent holds the record for being the lowest in a UK by-election.

Previous MP 
The seat had become vacant when the constituency's Independent Member of Parliament (MP), Eleanor Rathbone, died.  She had been the constituency's MP since the 1929 general election.

Votes

References

 
 

1946 elections in the United Kingdom
1946 in England
By-elections to the Parliament of the United Kingdom in the Combined English Universities